Allodin Fothergill (born 7 February 1987) is a Jamaican athlete who specializes in the 400m.

Personal bests

Achievements

1: Did not compete in the final (Jamaica finished 8th).

References

External links

1987 births
Living people
People from Saint Catherine Parish
Jamaican male sprinters
World Athletics Championships medalists
Central American and Caribbean Games gold medalists for Jamaica
Central American and Caribbean Games bronze medalists for Jamaica
Competitors at the 2010 Central American and Caribbean Games
World Athletics Indoor Championships medalists
Athletes (track and field) at the 2008 Summer Olympics
Olympic athletes of Jamaica
Central American and Caribbean Games medalists in athletics
Athletes (track and field) at the 2007 Pan American Games
Pan American Games competitors for Jamaica
20th-century Jamaican people
21st-century Jamaican people